Group C of the men's football tournament at the 2012 Summer Olympics took place from 26 July to 1 August 2012 in Cardiff's Millennium Stadium, Coventry's City of Coventry Stadium, Glasgow's Hampden Park, Manchester's Old Trafford and Newcastle's St James' Park. The group contained Belarus, Brazil, Egypt and New Zealand.

Teams

Standings

In the quarter-finals,
The winner of Group C, Brazil, advanced to play the runner-up of Group D, Japan.
The runner-up of Group C, Egypt, advanced to play the winner of Group D, Honduras.

Matches

Belarus vs New Zealand

Brazil vs Egypt

Egypt vs New Zealand

Brazil vs Belarus

Brazil vs New Zealand

Egypt vs Belarus

References

Group C
Group
2012–13 in Egyptian football
2012–13 in New Zealand association football
2012 in Belarusian football